At the 1948 Summer Olympics in London, 11 swimming events were contested, six for men and five for women.  All swimming events took place at the Empire Pool.  There was a total of 249 participants from 34 countries competing.

Medal table

Medal summary

Men's events

Women's events

Participating nations
249 swimmers from 34 nations competed.

Gallery of the medalists
Some of the Olympic medalists in London:

References

 
1948 Summer Olympics events
1948
1948 in swimming
Swimming competitions in the United Kingdom